Melbourne is the capital city of southeastern Australian state of Victoria and also the nation's second most populous city, and has been consistently voted one of the most liveable cities in the world. Located on the northern/eastern coastal plains of Port Phillip Bay, the city is the one of the drier capital cities in Australia (with an annual rainfall only half of Sydney's), but due to its relatively flat terrain and the runoffs fed from surrounding highlands, still has many lakes, ponds and wetlands, mainly managed by Melbourne Water and Parks Victoria. The larger waterbodies are used for water sports, mostly boating (especially sailing, rowing, canoeing and kayaking) but some are used for recreational activities like swimming, water skiing or model boating.

Melbourne also has a number of major artificial lakes as storage reservoirs that supply the city's drinking water, as well as many smaller service reservoirs or retention ponds used either for stormwater management or as auxiliary water storage for drinking supply or agricultural usage during dry seasons. Some of the smaller lakes and ponds are used as wildlife sanctuaries and as parklands for community pastimes such as angling and birdwatching.

The Yarra River, the main urban river of Melbourne, hosts many small wetlands and billabongs particularly through its middle reaches in the Yarra Valley, many of which are not named and are not included here. This article does not include lakes and reservoirs outside of the Greater Melbourne metropolitan area, for information on other lakes in Victoria see the List of reservoirs and dams in Australia.

Major lakes

 Albert Park Lake — Albert Park
 Aura Vale Lake — Menzies Creek
 Berwick Springs Lake — Narre Warren South
 Blackburn Lake — Blackburn
 Braeside Park and Woodlands Wetlands — Braeside
 Caribbean Lake — Scoresby
 Carrum Carrum Swamp (former) — southeastern suburbs
 Cherry Lake — Altona
 Edithvale Wetlands — Aspendale and Chelsea Heights
 Jells Lake — Wheelers Hill
 Karkarook Lake — Heatherton
 Koo-Wee-Rup Swamp (former) — outer southeastern suburbs
 La Trobe University Lakes — Bundoora
 Main Lake
 Small Lake
 Upper Lakes
 Springthorpe Lake
 Sports Fields Lake
 Lillydale Lake — Lilydale
 Lysterfield Lake — Lysterfield
 Patterson Lakes — Patterson Lakes
 Schooner Bay
 Barellan Harbours
 Lake Carramar
 Lake Illawong
 Lake Legana
 RAAF Lake — Point Cook
 Sanctuary Lakes — Point Cook
 Waterways Lake and Lagoons — Waterways

Small lakes, ponds & wetlands 

 Anniversary Lake — Berwick
 Banjo Paterson Lake — Lynbrook
 Blue Lake — Plenty
 Burndap Lakes — Maribyrnong
 Bushy Park Wetlands — Glen Waverley
 Cairnlea Lake — Cairnlea
 Casey Fields Lake — Cranbourne East
 Caulfield Racecourse Lake — Caulfield
 Clarendon Lake — Keysborough
 Coburg Lake — Merri Creek at Coburg North
 Dandenong Wetlands — Dandenong
 Edwardes Lake — Reservoir
 Ferntree Gully Quarry Lake — Ferntree Gully
 Glen Iris Wetlands — Glen Iris
 Hallam Bypass Retarding Basin & Wetlands, Narre Warren
 Hays Paddock Billabong — Kew East
 Hull Road Wetlands — Lilydale
 Jack Roper Reserve lake — Merlynston Creek at Broadmeadows
 Iramoo Lake — Cairnlea
 Jack Roper Reserve (CSL) Retarding Basin — Glenroy
 Kalparrin Lake — Greensborough
 Katoomba Lake — Wantirna
 Kew Billabong — Kew East
 Lake Mcivor — Roxburgh Park
 Lakewood Nature Reserve — Knoxfield
 Lake Treganowan (Emerald Lake) — Emerald
 Liverpool Road Retarding Basin — Boronia
 McAlpin Lake — Ringwood North
 Newport Lakes — Newport
 North Lake
 South Lake
 Oakwood Park Ponds — Noble Park North
 Pakenham Lake — Pakenham
 Polishing Ponds — Niddrie
 Princess Freeway Retarding Basin — Narre Warren North
 Queens Park Lake — Moonee Ponds
 Ringwood Lake — Ringwood
 River Gum Creek Reserve Wetlands — Hampton Park
 Rowville Lakes — Rowville
 Cogley Lake
 Sutton Lake
 Hill Lake
 Royal Botanic Gardens Lakes — Melbourne CBD
 Ornamental Lake
 Central Lake
 Nymphaea Lily Lake
 Sandown Park Lake — Springvale
 Spectacle Lake — Point Cook
 Springvale Botanical Cemetery Lake — Springvale
 Stamford Park Lake — Rowville
 Tatterson Park Ponds — Keysborough
 Taylors Lakes — Taylors Lakes
 Tirhatuan Wetlands — Rowville and Dandenong North
 Valley Lake - Niddrie
 Waterford Valley Lakes — Rowville
 Waverley Park Lake — Mulgrave
 West Gate Lakes — Port Melbourne

Major storage reservoirs 

 Cardinia Reservoir, Emerald — 
 Devilbend Reservoir, Tuerong — 
 Greenvale Reservoir, Greenvale — 
 Maroondah Reservoir, Healesville — 
 O'Shannassy Reservoir, McMahons Creek — 
 Silvan Reservoir, Silvan — 
 Sugarloaf Reservoir, Christmas Hills — 
 Tarago Reservoir, Neerim South — 
 Thomson River Dam, Thomson — 
 Upper Yarra Reservoir, Reefton — 
 Yan Yean Reservoir, Yan Yean —

Small service reservoirs 
 
 
 Beaconsfield Reservoir, Officer
 Bittern Reservoir, Tuerong
 Cheltenham Reservoir, Cheltenham
 Cranbourne Service Reservoir, Cranbourne
 Dandenong Reservoir, Belgrave
 Darebin Reservoirs, Reservoir
 Number 1
 Number 2
 Number 3
 Frankston Reservoir, Frankston South
 Mitcham Reservoir, Mitcham
 Moorabbin Reservoir, Bentleigh East
 Mornington Reservoir, Mount Eliza
 Mt. View Reservoir, Glen Waverley
 St. Albans Reservoir, St. Albans
 Surrey Hills Reservoir, Surrey Hills
 Tyabb Reservoir, Tyabb

Gallery

Further reading

See also
 List of reservoirs and dams in Australia
 Melbourne Water
 Yarra River

Melbourne
Lakes
Melbourne
Tourist attractions in Melbourne
Lists of tourist attractions in Victoria (Australia)